Dioscorea cayenensis is a species of yam in the genus Dioscorea that is a widely consumed West African domesticated crop. Dioscorea rotundata is sometimes treated as a subspecies, and sometimes also as a separate species. Common names include Guinea yam, yellow yam, and yellow Guinea yam.

It may be a triploid hybrid between the cultivated D. rotundata and the wild D. burkilliana.

References

cayenensis
Yams (vegetable)
Flora of West Tropical Africa
Crops originating from Africa